Carol Deirdre McGiffin (born 18 February 1960) is an English radio and television broadcaster, who has appeared on the daytime talk show Loose Women since the early 2000s. She appeared on the twelfth series of Celebrity Big Brother.

Early life
McGiffin was born in London and brought up in Maidstone, Kent, to John McGiffin and Heather Barham (10 July 1934 - 2003). She grew up with her two sisters Kim and Tracy (1963-2017) and her brother Mark.

Career
She started her broadcasting career in 1984 as a producer on cable channel Music Box and moved on to presenting in 1988 as co-host of the Chris Evans shows on GLR. Her style then and characterised today is based on comedic observation of men.

In 1995 McGiffin was a founding member of the Talk Radio UK team, co-presenting the popular weekday evening show The Rude Awakening with Moz Dee. When the show ended in September 1995 she became the station's music expert for around six months, hosting her own Friday evening review slot and appearing every week on Jonathan King's programme. In late 1996 she reappeared on Liberty Radio, co-hosting the breakfast show with Richard Skinner for six months. In 1997 and 1998 she united with Paul Ross and Nick Abbot in varying time slots.

In 1999 she joined London radio station LBC teaming up again with Abbot, who left the station after six months. McGiffin continued to host the show on her own with producer/sidekicks, including Marcus Railton and Jonathan Sanchez until 30 September 2000. She co-hosted phone-in shows on BBC London Live. In 2002, she occasionally teamed up with Abbot on Real Radio.

Between February and July 2006 she was the southern presenter of The Local Radio Company's night-time talk show North South Divided. Mike Elliott was her northern counterpart. In August 2006 McGiffin returned to LBC 97.3 presenting a Sunday morning show. McGiffin's weekly views on the world and travel advice in her Travel Clinic ended on 10 February 2008, when she left the station. Throughout the summer of 2012, she regularly reviewed the daily newspapers on This Morning. In August 2013, she entered the Celebrity Big Brother house to compete in the twelfth series, where she finished in fourth place.

In June 2018, it was announced by panellist Denise Welch that McGiffin would be returning to Loose Women after five years away.

In 2020, McGiffin teamed up with LBC Radio presenter Nick Abbot to create a weekly podcast "What's your problem?" with Nick and Carol. The show is released every Monday on Global Player and Apple Podcasts. 

In 2020, McGiffin said she supported Donald Trump and would vote for him if she could.

In 2021, she was criticised for voicing support for the January 6 rioters.

Television
 Loose Women (2000-2001, 2003–2013, 2018–) – Regular Panellist 
 Daily Cooks Challenge
 Who Wants to Be a Millionaire? – Contestant (2007)
 Tonight with Trevor McDonald
 Ant & Dec's Saturday Night Takeaway
 The Paul O'Grady Show – Guest
 The Jack Docherty Show
 8 Out of 10 Cats – Panellist
 Friday Night with Jonathan Ross
 Celebrity Juice – Panellist
 The Justin Lee Collins Show
 The Wright Stuff (2014)
 OK! TV
 Pointless – Contestant
 This Morning (2012, 2016) – Newspaper Reviewer
 Celebrity Big Brother (Summer 2013) – Housemate
 Celebrity Big Brother's Bit on the Side (Summer 2013) – Guest
 Celebrity Big Brother's Bit on the Psych (Winter 2014) – Panellist

Personal life
McGiffin is a survivor of the 2004 Indian Ocean earthquake.<ref name=thompson>Thompson Holidays brochure  retrieved 31 July 2008</ref> For several years, she has returned to Maidstone to join members of her family and take part in Race for Life to raise money for the charity Cancer Research UK, she does this in memory of her mother.

She and Chris Evans (broadcaster) were married in 1991. They separated in 1993 and were divorced in 1998.

Autobiography
In 2010, McGiffin released her autobiography, Oh, Carol!''.

References

External links

1960 births
English television presenters
Living people
People from Maidstone
English social commentators
English autobiographers
Women autobiographers